Maria Luísa Betioli (born 1 September 1948) is a Brazilian athlete. She competed in the women's high jump at the 1976 Summer Olympics.

References

External links
 

1948 births
Living people
Athletes (track and field) at the 1975 Pan American Games
Athletes (track and field) at the 1976 Summer Olympics
Athletes (track and field) at the 1979 Pan American Games
Brazilian female high jumpers
Olympic athletes of Brazil
Pan American Games athletes for Brazil
Place of birth missing (living people)
20th-century Brazilian women
21st-century Brazilian women